Anchilee Scott-Kemmis, (born 30 July 1999) is a Thai-Australian model and beauty pageant titleholder who was crowned Miss Thailand World 2022. She will represent Thailand at the Miss World 2022 competition. Scott-Kemmis was previously crowned Miss Universe Thailand 2021 and represented Thailand at the Miss Universe 2021 pageant, but she failed to enter the Top 16 semifinals, officially ending Thailand's six-year streak of consecutive placements in Miss Universe, from 2015 through 2020.

Early life and education
Scott-Kemmis was born on 30 July 1999 to an Australian father and a Thai mother. She graduated from NIST International School in Bangkok and received a bachelor's degree in Sociology from the University of Sydney, Australia.

As a child, she often got critiqued on her body shape. Due to this, she started the “#RealSizeBeauty” campaign on social media to raise awareness for redefining beauty standards by celebrating individuality and body positivity.

References

External links

1999 births
Living people
Miss Universe 2021 contestants
Anchilee Scott-Kemmis
Miss Thailand World
Anchilee Scott-Kemmis
Models from Sydney
Anchilee Scott-Kemmis
Anchilee Scott-Kemmis
Anchilee Scott-Kemmis
University of Sydney alumni
Anchilee Scott-Kemmis
Australian female models
Australian people of Thai descent
21st-century Australian women